Brief Story from the Green Planet is a 2019 internationally co-produced science fiction adventure film directed by Argentine filmmaker Santiago Loza. The film centres on Tania (Romina Escobar), a young transgender woman mourning the recent death of her grandmother, who discovers that her grandmother was taking care of an extraterrestrial alien and embarks on a quest with her longtime friends Daniela (Paula Grinszpan) and Pedro (Luis Sodá) to return the creature to where it was originally found.

The film is an international co-production between Argentina, Brazil, Germany and Spain.

The film premiered at the 2019 Berlin Film Festival, where it won the Teddy Award for best LGBTQ-themed feature film.

References

External links
 
 

2019 films
2010s science fiction adventure films
2019 LGBT-related films
Argentine science fiction adventure films
Argentine LGBT-related films
LGBT-related science fiction films
Films about trans women
2010s Spanish-language films
Argentine coming-of-age films
LGBT-related coming-of-age films
2010s Argentine films